Cercs is a municipality in the comarca of Berguedà in Catalonia. It is situated on the right bank of the Llobregat river above the Baells reservoir. It is the site of an important power station which burns the lignite extracted at Fígols and Saldes. The town is served by the C-1411 road between Berga and the Cadí tunnel.

The Pre-Romanesque church of Sant Quirze de Pedret is the source of two painted conjunts, which are now displayed at the diocesan museum in Solsona and in the Museu Nacional d'Art de Catalunya in Barcelona. The remains of the monastery of Sant Salvador de la Vedella are visible on a hill now in the middle of the Baells reservoir. 
The Cercs Mine Museum is located in the Sant Corneli colony, in the Cercs municipal area.

Demography

References

 Panareda Clopés, Josep Maria; Rios Calvet, Jaume; Rabella Vives, Josep Maria (1989). Guia de Catalunya, Barcelona: Caixa de Catalunya.  (Spanish).  (Catalan).

External links 
Official website 
 Government data pages 

Municipalities in Berguedà